Arfan Akram  (Arabic: عَرْفَان أَكْرَم) (born 17 November 1983) is a British cricketer. Akram played second XI cricket for Essex between 2001 and 2003, during which time he also played minor counties and List A cricket for Essex Cricket Board. In 2004 he played second XI cricket for Kent and Derbyshire. While studying leisure and tourism at Anglia Polytechnic University, between 2002 and 2005, he played for Cambridge University Centre of Cricketing Excellence, including eight first-class matches. Akram continued playing amateur cricket as captain of Wanstead and Snaresbrook CC, alongside his twin brother Adnan; he also played for the Marylebone Cricket Club (MCC) between 2006 and 2018.

In 2010, Akram was selected as one of 21 players to form the first Unicorns squad to take part in the Clydesdale Bank 40 domestic limited overs competition against the regular first-class counties. The Unicorns were made up of 15 former county cricket professionals and 6 young cricketers looking to make it in the professional game. In 2012, Akram was working as the university cricket co-ordinator at the University of East London, after which he worked for Essex Cricket as their cricket co-ordinator for East London.

References

External links

English cricketers
Unicorns cricketers
1983 births
English people of Pakistani descent
Living people
Essex Cricket Board cricketers
Twin sportspeople
English twins
Cambridge MCCU cricketers
British Asian cricketers
British sportspeople of Pakistani descent
Alumni of Anglia Ruskin University